Presidential elections were held in Togo on 25 August 1993. They were the first presidential elections in the country to feature more than one candidate. However, the major opposition parties boycotted the election, and only two minor candidates ran against incumbent President Gnassingbé Eyadéma, who ultimately won over 95% of the vote. Voter turnout was reported to be just 36%.

Results
The official results were inconsistent, with the total number of votes for candidates being ten votes lower than the number of valid votes, and the total of valid and invalid votes (762,593) being higher than the figure for total votes cast (751,495).

References

Togo
Presidential
Presidential elections in Togo
Togo